Wayne William Wolff  (born January 28, 1938) is a former professional American football guard in the American Football League (AFL). He attended Wake Forest University and played with the Buffalo Bills in 1961.

External links
Pro-Football reference

1938 births
Living people
People from Greensburg, Pennsylvania
Players of American football from Pennsylvania
Sportspeople from the Pittsburgh metropolitan area
Buffalo Bills players
Wake Forest Demon Deacons football players